BT Retail was a former division of BT Group that split in 2013 into two divisions. See:

 BT Consumer
 BT Business

References

BT Group